Amusaron kolga is a moth in the family Bombycidae. It was described by Herbert Druce in 1887. It is found in Cameroon.

References

External links

Endemic fauna of Cameroon
Bombycidae
Moths described in 1887